Count Your Blessings is a 1987 Dutch comedy film directed by Pieter Verhoeff. The film was selected as the Dutch entry for the Best Foreign Language Film at the 60th Academy Awards, but was not accepted as a nominee.

Cast
 Mirjam Sternheim as Martje Wilbrink
 Peter Tuinman as Leo de Zeeuw
 Geert de Jong as Rosa Leroy
 Marijke Veugelers as Karin de Bruin
 Michiel Romeyn as Harrie de Bruin
 Loudi Nijhoff as Moeder Kalk
 Aart Lamberts as Wouter Kalk

See also
 List of submissions to the 60th Academy Awards for Best Foreign Language Film
 List of Dutch submissions for the Academy Award for Best Foreign Language Film

References

External links
 

1987 films
1987 comedy films
Dutch comedy films
1980s Dutch-language films
Films directed by Pieter Verhoeff
Films produced by Rob Houwer
Films shot in the Netherlands